Hamengkubuwono I (Javanese script: ꦱꦸꦭ꧀ꦠꦤ꧀ꦲꦩꦼꦁꦏꦸꦧꦸꦮꦤꦆ, Bahasa Jawa: Sri Sultan Hamengkubuwono I), born Raden Mas Sujana (Kartasura, 16 August 1717Yogyakarta, 24 March 1792), was the first sultan of Yogyakarta. He reigned from 1755 to 1792.

References

Further reading
 Ricklefs, M.C. (1974) Jogjakarta under Sultan Mangkubumi, 1749–1792: A History of the Division of Java. London Oriental Series, vol. 30. London: Oxford University Press (Revised Indonesian edition 2002).
 Ricklefs MC. 2001. A History of Modern Indonesia: 3rd Edition. Palgrave and Stanford University Press.
 Purwadi. 2007. Sejarah Raja-Raja Jawa. Yogyakarta: Media Ilmu.
 Heryanto F. 2004. Mengenal Keraton Ngayogyakarta Hadiningrat. Yogyakarta: Warna Grafika.

1717 births
1792 deaths
18th-century Indonesian people
Burials at Imogiri
Indonesian Muslims
Indonesian royalty
National Heroes of Indonesia
Sultans of Yogyakarta